Joseph Stanley Foxall (8 September 1914 – 12 August 1991) was an English footballer who played in the Football League as a forward for West Ham United.

Career
Born in Crowle, Lincolnshire, Foxall had been playing football at Gainsborough Trinity, where he spent three seasons, before being signed by West Ham United in 1934. He made four league appearances in his first season, replacing John Foreman on the right wing.

He represented the London Combination against the Central League in November 1936.

Foxall could operate anywhere along the forward line, and was often moved from the right wing to a more central role, swapping with Sam Small, by Charlie Paynter.

Foxall made 149 war-time league and cup appearances for the east London club, scoring 63 goals, and was a member of the team that won the Football League War Cup in 1940.

His career at West Ham was cut short by a knee injury sustained in a game against Queens Park Rangers in September 1944.

He subsequently joined Southern League side Colchester United in 1948, where he spent two seasons.

He later played for Chelmsford City.

Honours

Club
West Ham United
 Football League War Cup Winner (1): 1939–40

Colchester United
 Southern Football League Runner-up (1): 1949–50
 Southern Football League Cup Winner (1): 1949–50
 Southern Football League Cup Runner-up (2): 1947–48, 1948–49

References

External links
 Stan Foxall at Spartacus Educational

1914 births
1991 deaths
People from the Borough of North Lincolnshire
English footballers
Association football forwards
Gainsborough Trinity F.C. players
West Ham United F.C. players
Colchester United F.C. players
Chelmsford City F.C. players
English Football League players